Gomez Addams is the patriarch of the fictional Addams Family, created by cartoonist Charles Addams for The New Yorker magazine in the 1940s, and subsequently portrayed on television, in film and on the stage.

Cartoons
In Charles Addams's original cartoons, Gomez was the nameless patriarch of the family. He had a somewhat grotesque appearance, with a tubby body, a snub-nose, a crooked tooth and a receding chin. He was often depicted reading in the den or lounging on the windowsill.

Origin of the name
In the Charles Addams cartoons, Gomez—as with all of the members of the family—had no given name.  When The Addams Family television series was being developed, Charles Addams suggested naming the character either Repelli or Gomez. Addams left the final choice up to portrayer John Astin, who chose Gomez.

Because "Gómez" is strictly a surname in the Hispanic world, the character's name was changed to "Homero" ("Homer") in Hispanic American translations. In Spain, where the surname originated, he is called Gómez.

Personality

Like the other members of the family, Gomez's personality became largely codified by the television series. He is depicted as being of Castilian extraction and Spanish ancestry, which was first brought up in "Art and the Addams Family" on December 18, 1964; in the episode, Gomez says his "ancestral land" is Spain and Morticia refers to him as a "mad Castilian."

John Astin had long sessions with Addams and series producer David Levy, who gave him free rein in developing the character. Enlarging on Addams' description of Gomez as a Latin lover type, Astin suggested the eye-rolling, pencil moustache, and ardent devotion to Morticia.

In the Addams cartoons and the television shows, Gomez wore a necktie to his chalk-stripe suit, though in the films, Gomez wears a bow tie and also wears a wide variety of extravagant clothing. He spends $1000 per month on cigars, and he is an accomplished juggler and knife-thrower. He loves crashing toy trains and diving for crabs on Halloween. When he wishes to know the time he will pull a pocket watch from the breast pocket of his coat (the chain is attached to the lapel) while simultaneously checking a wrist watch.

Gomez is an athletic, acrobatic, and eccentric multi-billionaire. Though an extremely successful businessman, having acquired much of his wealth through inheritance and investments, he has little regard for money and will casually spend thousands of dollars on any whimsical endeavor. Gomez's investments are guided more by whimsy than strategy, yet luck rarely fails him. Gomez owns businesses around the world, including a swamp, bought for "scenic value", crocodile farm, a buzzard farm, a salt mine, a tombstone factory, a uranium mine, and many others. In Forbes 2007 "Fictional 15" list of the richest fictional characters, he was ranked #12 with a net worth of $2 billion.

As a young man, Gomez was, per flashback in "Morticia's Romance", a perennially sickly youth, gaining perfect health only after meeting Morticia. He nevertheless studied law (voted "Most Likely Never to Pass the Bar") and is quite proud his law class voted him "Least Likely to Succeed"; and although he rarely practices, he takes an absurd delight in losing cases, boasting of having put many criminals behind bars while acting as their defense attorney, claiming that he "never sent an innocent man to jail"; this is somewhat contradicted in the episode "The Addams Family Goes to Court", where it is noted that while Gomez has never won a case, he has never lost one either. This backstory, while not mentioned directly, is recalled in  The Addams Family, when Gomez announces he will serve as his own attorney, only to lose the case. In The New Addams Family, Gomez had also studied medicine.

Gomez has offered contradictory views on work; in one episode, he claims that, although his family was wealthy even in his childhood, he nonetheless performed odd jobs and "scrimped and saved [his] kopeks", which he considered character building. When his son Pugsley decided to find a job, however, Gomez was horrified, claiming that "No Addams has worked in 200 years!" In the 1991 animated series, Gomez deliberately tried to fail at something, anything, only to realize in the end of the episode that he is only a failure in failure. This is additionally contradicted in "New Neighbors Meet the Addams Family" (season 1, episode 9, 1964). He specifically states that Thing always beats him at bridge.

Portrayals

In the 1960s American television series, Gomez was portrayed by John Astin. Astin also voiced the character in an episode of The New Scooby-Doo Movies which featured the family. In the first animated series by Hanna-Barbera, Gomez was voiced by Lennie Weinrib. In the second animated series, also by Hanna-Barbera, Gomez's voice was again performed by John Astin.

Gomez was played by Raul Julia in The Addams Family (1991) and Addams Family Values (1993). After Julia died in 1994, Tim Curry took up the role in the television film Addams Family Reunion in 1998 and in 1999 Gomez was played by Glenn Taranto in the TV series The New Addams Family, where he returned to the madcap attitude of his original 1960s incarnation with Astin guest starring as Gomez's grandfather. In the Broadway musical, Gomez was initially played by Nathan Lane and later by Roger Rees. In the UK tour of The Addams Family musical in 2017, Gomez was portrayed by Cameron Blakely. Blakely is set to reprise his role in 2021. The films differ from the television series in several ways, most significantly that Fester is Gomez's brother (in the television show, he was Morticia's uncle). The Addams Family notes that Gomez's parents were murdered by an angry mob, though in one scene in the sequel, when Gomez catches Fester with a pornographic magazine, they both look at the centerfold (unseen by the viewer) and fondly say "Mom". In Addams Family Values, Gomez and Morticia have a third child named Pubert, a seemingly indestructible baby with a thin, black moustache like his father.

Oscar Isaac voiced Gomez in the 2019 computer-animated adaptation of The Addams Family and its 2021 sequel. In the latter film, it is revealed that Gomez wears a wig made of Sasquatch fur due to losing his original hair in a napalm accident.

Luis Guzmán portrays Gomez in Netflix series Wednesday. Both he and Morticia first met at Nevermore Academy, a boarding school for supernatural people (also known as "Outcasts"), it is revealed in flashbacks that he and Morticia were involved in the death of a local teenage boy named Garrett Gates, who tried to kill Gomez in a blind rage, due to Gates' own infatuation with Morticia. Sheriff Galpin still believes that Gomez committed the murder on purpose and holds a grudge against the Addams' bloodline. After Gomez is re-arrested for Gates' murder, Morticia and Wednesday exhume Gates' body and find evidence that Gates died of accidental nightshade poisoning, clearing Gomez.

Relationships

Family tree

References

Comics characters introduced in 1942
Fictional lawyers
Fictional businesspeople
Fictional Hispanic and Latino American people
Fictional socialites
Fictional fencers
Male characters in comics
Male characters in film
Male characters in television
The Addams Family characters
Fictional Spanish people